Zapicán is a village in the northwest of Lavalleja Department in Uruguay.

Geography
The railroad track Montevideo - Nico Pérez - Río Branco passes along the south limits of the village.

History
It was founded by Pablo Fernández in September 1891 and on 9 June 1913, it was declared a "Pueblo" (village) by the Act of Ley Nº 4.337.

Population
In 2011 Zapicán had a population of 553.
 
Source: Instituto Nacional de Estadística de Uruguay

References

External links
INE map of Zapicán

Populated places in the Lavalleja Department